The coins of the Maldivian rufiyaa are documented since it became a British protectorate in 1304 AH (1887).

The Maldive Islands were granted independence outside the Commonwealth of Nations as an independent monarchy. The 2nd Republic was declared in November 1968. The Maldive Islands returned to the Commonwealth in 1982.

Note about the Islamic calendar: The dates do not always correspond exactly, as the AH year is 11 days shorter than a year on the Gregorian calendar.

The coins of 1318–20 AH (1900–02)

In 1318 AH (1900), a copper larin (or laari) was struck. In 1319 AH (1901), a copper Larin was also struck. In 1320 AH (1902), a copper Larin & a 4 laari was struck.

The coins of 1331 AH (1913)

These coins were an issue of 1 laari & 4 laari coins that we re struck in 1331 AH (1913) at Heaton's Mint in Birmingham, England, despite the fact that they are inscribed 'Struck at Malé.' in Arabic.

The coins of 1379 AH (1960)

These coins were the last coins to have been issued under the British protectorate. They were also the only coins to have been struck during the reign of Sultan Mohammed Farid Didi (1954–68). These coins were struck at the Royal Mint in London. They have the same dimensions as the coins of Ceylon, which were in everyday circulation in the Maldive Islands. The coins that were struck in 1960 were the following denominations:

1 laari
2 laari
5 laari
10 laari
25 laari
50 laari

There were two types of the 50 laari coin. One of these has a security groove along the edge of the coin, and the other has a milled edge.  The coins are entirely inscribed in Arabic and Divehi.

Coins of the 2nd Republic outside the Commonwealth

The first coins to be issued by the Maldive Islands in the period outside the  Commonwealth (1965–82) was the issue of 1389 AH (1970). In this period, the first coins denominated in rufiyaa were struck. Only in the late 1970s do the dates on Maldivian coins begin to correspond exactly (e.g. the 1399 AH (1979) and 1400 AH (1980) silver 100 rufiyaa commemorative coins.). The 1389 AH coins are of the same design as the 1960 coins, but all references to the Sultanate were replaced with references to the Republic. Only in the late 1970s did English first appear on Maldivian coins.

Coins of the 2nd Republic within the Commonwealth

The first coin to be issued after the return of the Maldive Islands' return to the Commonwealth was the 1 rufiyaa coin dated 1402 AH (1982). This coin has the Coat-of-Arms on the obverse with the dates. The reverse of the coin is inscribed 'REPUBLIC OF MALDIVES 1 RUFIYAA'. A series of minor coins denominated from 1 laari to 50 laari was released into circulation in 1404 AH (1984). Since then, a number of commemorative coins have been struck, including a series of 250 rufiyaa medal-coins (listed in the 2005 edition of Krause Unusual World Coins catalogue). In 1416 AH, the 2 rufiyaa coin was released into circulation to replace the 2 rufiyaa banknote.

Gallery

References

 Unusual World Coins 4th Edition. By Colin R. Bruce II. Edited by Tom Michael and George Cuhaj. -

See also
 Maldivian rufiyaa
 Maldivian laari
 Currency of Maldives